Micia was a large Roman fort for auxiliary troops and an important part of the western Dacian limes (limes Dacia). The archaeological site is located in the municipality of Vețel (Witzel), Hunedoara County in Transylvania, Romania. This Roman garrison monitored and secured the road and the river route to Partiscum, today Szeged, Hungary. In addition, there was a strategically important river port. In the civil settlement, there were large baths and a small amphitheater. The large number of ancient inscriptions are significant.

Castra

Vicus

Thermae

Amphitheater 
In the southeast of the great military bath, at a distance of about hundred meters, there was a small amphitheater. Possessed in a circle around an arena, the stone foundation of the walls had a circumference of 104 meters. The arena consisted of 31 × 29 meters.

Necropolis

See also
List of castra

Notes

External links

Roman castra from Romania - Google Maps / Earth 

Roman auxiliary forts in Dacia
Archaeological sites in Romania
Roman auxiliary forts in Romania
Ancient history of Transylvania
Historic monuments in Hunedoara County